The 1967 La Flèche Wallonne was the 31st edition of La Flèche Wallonne cycle race and was held on 28 April 1967. The race started in Liège and finished in Marcinelle. The race was won by Eddy Merckx of the Peugeot team.

General classification

References

1967 in road cycling
1967
1967 in Belgian sport
1967 Super Prestige Pernod